Little Moscow is a Polish-Russian co-production directed by Waldemar Krzystek and released in 2008.

Plot
It is 1967, the middle of the Cold War in Legnica, south western Poland. The Red Army have turned the town into the largest Soviet garrison on foreign soil due to Legnica's proximity to Czechoslovakia and East Germany. Vera is the wife of the crack Soviet pilot Yura, but after attending a cultural event to ease Polish-Soviet tensions falls head over heels in love with Michał, a Polish officer. The forbidden love takes many twists and turns, and the tale begins and ends in post-Soviet Legnica in 2008 as both Yura and his angry daughter Vera Junior try to make peace with the past.

Cast 
 Svetlana Khodchenkova as Vera Svetlova
 Lesław Żurek as Michał Janicki
 Dmitry Ulyanov as Yura Svetlov, Vera's husband
 Weronika Książkiewicz
 Artyom Tkachenko as Sayat

Awards 
At the 33rd annual Polish Film Festival in 2008 the category of best actress was won by Svetlana Khodchenkova and Golden Lion by director Waldemar Krzystek.

References

External links 

2008 films
Polish drama films
Films set in Poland
Films shot in Poland
Legnica
Films directed by Waldemar Krzystek
Films set in 1967